The Brügger & Thomet VP9 (Veterinary Pistol 9mm) is a manual repeater, magazine fed, integrally-suppressed pistol created by Brügger & Thomet (now B&T) for use as a veterinary pistol for putting down sick and wounded animals.  The design is based on the Welrod pistol.

Design
The design is heavily based on the Welrod pistol designed by the Special Operations Executive (SOE) for use in World War II and is mechanically almost identical save for the addition of a grip safety, which needs to be depressed before the bolt can by cycled. Its original purpose was to quickly and humanely put down sick animals without frightening nearby animals or people. B&T first produced the pistol when approached by a customer requesting 25 bolt-action suppressed pistols. B&T suggested using the Welrod design but adapting it for 9mm which the customer agreed to. Initially only 30 were made, 25 for the customer and 5 for hobby use by B&T employees, but production and sales were expanded when it was realized that there was a market for such a pistol.

Variants
Due to international demand, beginning in 2021 Brügger & Thomet began importing a version of the pistol to the United States as the Station SIX-9. To comply with American handgun regulations, the barrel length was increased and the grip was lengthened. The integral suppressor included with the gun is of a wiper-style design while an additional metal-baffle training suppressor available. A second .45 ACP variant called the Station SIX-45 with a further lengthened grip and feeding from 1911 magazines was also announced.

See also 
 Welrod

References

External links 
 Product page at Brügger & Thomet Archived

9mm Parabellum firearms
Firearms of Switzerland
Pistols
Silenced firearms